In macroeconomics, factor shares are the share of production given to the factors of production, usually capital and labor.  This concept uses the methods and fits into the framework of neoclassical economics.

Derivation
In exogenous growth models, the production function can be represented by:

with Y total production, K capital, and L labor.
So a representative agent will attempt to maximize a profit function:

where  is the cost to the firm, r the rental rate of capital, w the wage rate for labor, and P is the price of the output.

As in microeconomics supply and demand models, first-order conditions that the derivative of this function with respect to capital and labor will be zero at the functions maximum.  Thus (assuming P = 1) we can calculate the wages and the rental rate of capital:

Now we can write the expenditure allocated to labor as 

and to capital as 

So the factor share devoted to labor is:

and the factor share devoted to capital is:

References

Neoclassical economics
Macroeconomics